Luigi Carpentieri (1920-1987) was an Italian assistant director (1940-1949) and film producer (1947-1968). Together with Ermanno Donati, he founded the production company "Athena Cinematografica", which in 1960 became "Panda Cinematografica". All films produced by [[the company were genre films.

Along with Ermanno Donati, Carpentieri Godi Media on the Nastro d'Argento award for Best Producer for the film The Day of the Owl.

Filmography

As script supervisor
 Torna, caro ideal! (1939)

As assistant director
 Cantate con me! (1940)
 Beatrice Cenci (1941)
 La bocca sulla strada (1941)
 Mamma (1941)
 Casanova farebbe così! (1942)
 Non ti pago! (1942)
 La Gorgona (1942)
 Vertigine (1942)
 Il fidanzato di mia moglie (1943)
 Fuga a due voci (1943)
 Non sono superstizioso... ma! (1943)
 Lo sbaglio di essere vivo (1945)
 Torna... a Sorrento (1945)
 L'altra (1947)
 Il diavolo bianco (1947)

As director
 Golden Madonna (1949)  - Italian version

As producer
 La primula bianca (1947) (also assistant director)
 Vent'anni (1949/1950) (also production manager)
 Atto d'accusa (1950)
 La vendetta del corsaro (1951)
 Red Shirts (1952)
 La nemica (1952)
 Saluti e baci (1952)
 Canzone appassionata (1953)
 Capitan Fantasma (1953)
 Ci troviamo in galleria (1953)
 Prigionieri del male (1955)
 La vena d'oro (1955)
 Souvenir d'Italie (1956)
 Totò lascia o raddoppia? (1956)
 I Vampiri (1957)
 Domenica è sempre domenica (1958)
 The Son of the Red Corsair (1959)
 Genitori in blue jeans (1959)
 Noi duri (1959)
 Winter Holidays (1959)
 Giuseppe venduto dai fratelli (1960)
 I piaceri del sabato notte (1960)
 Maciste nella valle dei re (1960)
 Maciste alla corte del Gran Khan (1961)
 Atlas Against the Cyclops (1961) 
 Maciste alla corte del Gran Khan (1961)
 The Witch's Curse (1962)
 Marco Polo (1962)
 The Horrible Dr. Hichcock (1962)
 Le massaggiatrici (1962)
 The Ghost (1963) (credited as Louis Mann)
 The Magnificent Adventurer (1963)
 L'idea fissa (1964)
 Samson in King Solomon's Mines (1964)
 Il ponte dei sospiri (1964)
 James Tont operazione U.N.O. (1965)
 James Tont operazione D.U.E. (1965)
 Su e giù (1965)
 The Third Eye (1966)
 The Hills Run Red (1966)
 Navajo Joe (1966)
 Matchless (film) (1967)
 Col cuore in gola (1967)
 Manon 70 (1967)
 L'oro di Londra (1967) (also story) (credited as Louis Mann)
 The Day of the Owl (1968)
 La coppia (1968)

References

Footnotes

Sources

External links
 

Italian film producers
1920 births
1987 deaths